Fairfield Township is a township in Cumberland County, in the U.S. state of New Jersey. It is part of the Vineland-Bridgeton metropolitan statistical area, which encompasses all of Cumberland County for statistical purposes and which constitutes a part of the Delaware Valley. As of the 2020 United States census, the township's population was 5,546, a decrease of 749 (−11.9%) from the 2010 census count of 6,295, which in turn reflected an increase of 12 (+0.2%) from the 6,283 counted in the 2000 census.

Fairfield Township was formed by Royal charter on May 12, 1697, from portions of the Cohansey Township area, while still part of Salem County, and was formed as a precinct in the newly created Cumberland County on January 19, 1748. It was incorporated on February 21, 1798, as one of the initial group of 104 townships in the state by an act of the New Jersey Legislature. Portions of the township were taken to form Downe Township (September 26, 1772), Millville Township (February 24, 1801) and Lawrence Township (February 17, 1885).

The name Fairfield refers to its original settlers, who were émigrés from Fairfield, Connecticut who settled in the area in 1697. The oldest Presbyterian church in South Jersey is said to date to June 1697. There is a plaque and an old cemetery which indicates the original log building. When it was first created as one of Cumberland County's original six townships, it included land that would later become Commercial Township, Downe Township, Lawrence Township and Millville.

Geography
According to the U.S. Census Bureau, the township had a total area of 43.82 square miles (113.50 km2), including 41.12 square miles (106.50 km2) of land and 2.70 square miles (7.00 km2) of water (6.17%).

Fairton, with a 2010 census population of 1,264,) and Gouldtown are unincorporated communities and census-designated places (CDPs) located within Fairfield Township.

Other unincorporated communities, localities and place names located partially or completely within the township include Back Neck, Ben Davis Point, Clarks Pond, Fordville, Lanings Wharf, Mulfords Landing, New England Crossroads, Sea Breeze and Tindells Landing.

The township has three primary population centers: Sea Breeze, Fairton (originally named Bumbridge) and Gouldtown, an old African American community from the segregation period.

Fairfield Township borders the Cumberland County municipalities of Bridgeton, Deerfield Township, Greenwich Township, Hopewell Township, Lawrence Township, Millville and Upper Deerfield Township, along with the Delaware Bay.

Demographics

2010 census

Fairfield Township had the highest percentage of Native Americans in any municipality in New Jersey, at 5.10% in the 2010 census.

The Census Bureau's 2006–2010 American Community Survey showed that (in 2010 inflation-adjusted dollars) median household income was $46,895 (with a margin of error of +/− $3,014) and the median family income was $55,286 (+/− $4,900). Males had a median income of $45,333 (+/− $4,287) versus $32,763 (+/− $2,703) for females. The per capita income for the borough was $20,619 (+/− $1,444). About 6.7% of families and 10.3% of the population were below the poverty line, including 17.1% of those under age 18 and 4.3% of those age 65 or over.

2000 census
As of the 2000 census, there were 6,283 people, 1,751 households, and 1,322 families residing in the township. The racial makeup of the township was 41.41% White, 47.43% African American, 5.08% Native American, 0.56% Asian, 0.03% Pacific Islander, 2.39% from other races, and 3.10% from two or more races. Hispanic or Latino of any race were 8.87% of the population.

There were 1,751 households, out of which 28.2% had children under the age of 18 living with them, 50.7% were married couples living together, 18.5% had a female householder with no husband present, and 24.5% were non-families. 20.4% of all households were made up of individuals, and 8.1% had someone living alone who was 65 years of age or older.  The average household size was 2.78 and the average family size was 3.19.

In the township the population was spread out, with 19.8% under the age of 18, 8.8% from 18 to 24, 36.4% from 25 to 44, 24.3% from 45 to 64, and 10.7% who were 65 years of age or older. The median age was 37 years. For every 100 females, there were 146.7 males.  For every 100 females age 18 and over, there were 161.7 males.

The median income for a household in the township was $37,891, and the median income for a family was $41,326. Males had a median income of $31,858 versus $23,931 for females. The per capita income for the township was $17,547.  About 6.9% of families and 11.2% of the population were below the poverty line, including 14.9% of those under age 18 and 7.8% of those age 65 or over.

Government

Local government
Fairfield Township is governed under the Township form of New Jersey municipal government, one of 141 municipalities (of the 564) statewide that use this form, the second-most commonly used form of government in the state. The Township Committee is comprised of five members, who are elected directly by the voters at-large in partisan elections to serve three-year terms of office on a staggered basis, with either one or two seats coming up for election each year as part of the November general election in a three-year cycle. At an annual reorganization meeting, the Township Committee selects one of its members to serve as Mayor and another as Deputy Mayor, each serving a one-year term.

, members of the Fairfield Township Committee are Mayor Tommy Clark Jr. (D, term on committee ends December 31, 2023; term as mayor ends 2022), Deputy Mayor Benjamin Byrd Sr. (D, term on committee and as deputy mayor ends 2022), Stephen M. Bateman (D, 2024), David F. Gonzalez (D, 2022) and Michael Peterson (D, 2024).

JoAnne Servais was appointed to serve the unexpired term ending December 2014 of Dennis Pierce, who had resigned from office in June 2012 citing health issues.

Federal, state, and county representation 
Fairfield Township is located in the 2nd Congressional District and is part of New Jersey's 1st state legislative district. Prior to the 2011 reapportionment following the 2010 Census, Fairfield Township had been in the 3rd state legislative district.

Politics
As of March 2011, there were a total of 3,639 registered voters in Fairfield Township, of which 1,603 (44.1%) were registered as Democrats, 409 (11.2%) were registered as Republicans and 1,627 (44.7%) were registered as Unaffiliated. There were no voters registered to other parties.

In the 2012 presidential election, Democrat Barack Obama received 76.9% of the vote (1,830 cast), ahead of Republican Mitt Romney with 22.4% (534 votes), and other candidates with 0.6% (15 votes), among the 2,405 ballots cast by the township's 3,739 registered voters (26 ballots were spoiled), for a turnout of 64.3%. In the 2008 presidential election, Democrat Barack Obama received 75.9% of the vote (1,860 cast), ahead of Republican John McCain, who received 22.3% (547 votes), with 2,451 ballots cast among the township's 3,707 registered voters, for a turnout of 66.1%. In the 2004 presidential election, Democrat John Kerry received 68.7% of the vote (1,476 ballots cast), outpolling Republican George W. Bush, who received around 29.6% (636 votes), with 2,149 ballots cast among the township's 3,400 registered voters, for a turnout percentage of 63.2.

In the 2013 gubernatorial election, Democrat Barbara Buono received 61.0% of the vote (774 cast), ahead of Republican Chris Christie with 37.2% (472 votes), and other candidates with 1.7% (22 votes), among the 1,315 ballots cast by the township's 3,584 registered voters (47 ballots were spoiled), for a turnout of 36.7%. In the 2009 gubernatorial election, Democrat Jon Corzine received 65.% of the vote (925 ballots cast), ahead of both Republican Chris Christie with 27.2% (387 votes) and Independent Chris Daggett with 3.9% (56 votes), with 1,424 ballots cast among the township's 3,586 registered voters, yielding a 39.7% turnout.

Education 
The Fairfield Township School District serves public school students in pre-kindergarten through eighth grade. The district opened the new Fairfield Township School in September 2006, consolidating all grades into a single building located at 375 Gouldtown-Woodruff Road in the Gouldtown section of the township. As of the 2019–20 school year, the district, comprised of one school, had an enrollment of 554 students and 54.0 classroom teachers (on an FTE basis), for a student–teacher ratio of 10.3:1.

Public school students in ninth through twelfth grades attend Cumberland Regional High School, which also serves students from Deerfield Township, Greenwich Township, Hopewell Township, Shiloh Borough, Stow Creek Township and Upper Deerfield Township. As of the 2019–20 school year, the high school had an enrollment of 998 students and 78.3 classroom teachers (on an FTE basis), for a student–teacher ratio of 12.7:1. The high school district has a nine-member board of education, with board seats allocated to the constituent municipalities based on population, with each municipality assigned a minimum of one seat; Deerfield Township has one seat on the board.

Students are also eligible to attend Cumberland County Technology Education Center in Vineland, serving students from the entire county in its full-time technical training programs, which are offered without charge to students who are county residents.

Transportation

Roads and highways

Route 49 is the main highway serving Fairfield Township. County Route 553 also traverses the township.

Public transportation
NJ Transit offers service on the 553 route between Upper Deerfield Township and Atlantic City.

Notable people

People who were born in, residents of, or otherwise closely associated with Fairfield Township include:

 Nathaniel Clark Burt (1825–1874), Presbyterian clergyman
 Harold Gould (1924–2012), baseball pitcher with the Philadelphia Stars in the Negro leagues from 1947 to 1948
 John T. Nixon (1820–1889), represented New Jersey's 1st congressional district in the United States House of Representatives from 1859 to 1863
 Theophilus Gould Steward (1843–1924), author, educator, and clergyman, who was a U.S. Army chaplain and Buffalo Soldier of 25th U.S. Colored Infantry

References

External links

Fairfield Township web site
Cumberland County web page for Fairfield Township

 
1697 establishments in New Jersey
Populated places established in 1697
Township form of New Jersey government
Townships in Cumberland County, New Jersey